George H. Middleton (fl. 1870 in Strathmeigle, Scotland – 1892) was a Canadian engineer, who had worked on as a sub-contractor of the Canadian Pacific Railway and partner to Robert G. Reid in the building of the Newfoundland Railway.

Middleton came to Canada in the 1870s with two of his brothers to work on the construction of Canadian Pacific Railway. He had met Reid while working on the CPR and they eventually became partners. Middleton's brother Alexander participated in the surveying of the route for the Newfoundland Railway in 1889.

Both Middleton and Reid had contracted with the Whiteway government of Newfoundland on June 18, 1890 to build sections of the Railway. Sometime in 1892 he had a falling out with Reid and dissolved the partnership. Reid went on to complete the Railway contract.

See also
 Newfoundland Railway
 List of people of Newfoundland and Labrador

References

External links
 Newfoundland Railway - Newfoundland & Labrador Heritage
 The Reid Family: Newfoundland

Year of birth missing
1892 deaths
Scottish emigrants to pre-Confederation Newfoundland
Newfoundland Colony people